Joey Joleen Mataele is an activist for the rights of transgender women from Tonga.

Activism
In 1992, Mataele co-founded the Tonga Leitis Association, and became its executive director. She is also the Pacific Island Representative on the International Lesbian, Gay, Bisexual, Trans and Intersex Association Executive Board and Chairperson of the South Pacific MSM (Men Who Have Sex with Men) Network Group.

In 1993, Mataele founded the Miss Galaxy Queen Pageant as an annual event to celebrate the diversity and creativity of fakaleitis and the LGBTQI community in Tonga.

Mataele is also the co-founder of the Pacific Sexual Diversity Network, which was established in 2007 during the Pacific Games in Samoa. The organisation includes members from Fiji, Samoa, the Cook Islands and Papua New Guinea, and aims to work together to gain a stronger voice at regional and international gatherings.

Mataele is the subject of the feature documentary film Leitis in Waiting.

Honour and award

Honour
 : Knight of the Order of Sālote Tupou III

Award
 : Recipient of the Daily Points of Light Award

References

External links
 Joey Joleen Mataele's profile on Pacific Community

Living people
Tongan activists
Year of birth missing (living people)
Transgender rights activists